Father Christmas Is Back is a 2021 British Christmas comedy film directed by Philippe Martinez and Mick Davis and starring Elizabeth Hurley, Nathalie Cox, John Cleese, and Kelsey Grammer. It was released on 7 November 2021 by Netflix.

Plot
Four sisters – Caroline, Joanna, Paulina, and Vicky – reunite for the Christmas Holiday in Caroline and her husband, Peter's Yorkshire mansion. Caroline is obsessed that everything be perfect. However, things don't entirely go to plan.

The tree crashes to the floor on the 22nd, so Peter and his children, Daisey and Henry, redecorate it with homemade ornaments. Vicky, the youngest of Caroline's sisters, arrives first, followed by Joanna with her boyfriend Felix and their mum. Paulina arrives on foot as their uncle John watches from afar.

Gathering together by the tree, Joanna eyes the tree with disdain and is visibly unenthusiastic about her niece and nephew, forbidding them from touching any of her stuff; whereas the bohemian youngest Vicky happily gives them things from her purse she got on her recent couch-surfing trip around the US.

The adults, after lounging by the fire all move to the library, where Paulina is working on her thesis on the Fab Four (The Beatles). There, Caroline shows them the holiday, completely mapped out. Joanna loses her temper at Vicky after she alludes to (Joanna's) greater age one too many times, so announces that she and Felix will stay in the town.

Before anyone leaves, the four sisters are in the kitchen and Vicky blurts out that she'd stayed with their estranged father James and his girlfriend Jackie in Florida for a couple of weeks. The other three are reeling from the shock of this news when their mother comes in.

Sitting by the fire again, everyone in silence, a car pulls up. Vicky had invited their father and Jackie to their Christmas celebration without telling anyone. After the men introduce themselves, and everyone has tea, the sisters slip out to talk. They criticize Jackie for her American accent and youth, as she's only 35.

Turning their anger on Vicky, she gets fed up, taking off in Felix's Rolls-Royce. In the meantime we learn that Joanna is a fashion editor, so her lavish clothes are really work perks. Vicky ends up at the village pub, where she seduces the bartender and spends the night. Their mother also stays out all night, alone with John.

On the 24th the family goes to a fundraising event for the church. Vicky is selling Joanne's clothes at one of the stalls for very low prices, and offers Felix's car as a prize. The couple have to get their things back by participating in the event, in her case buying her clothes and he has to continue spinning the wheel until he wins the car back.

At lunch, when John won't let James speak, they go outside to have it out. James instead proposes to Jackie. He later apologizes to his girls for having left 27 years ago, but explains he paid for everything unbeknownst to them, and their mother always kept him updated. They invite him to join him at the pub.

The group return after a long afternoon of drinking to Jackie's New York style surprise, a huge light display which inevitably blows out the old electrical circuits of the stately manor. Peter distributes blankets in the dark, while Joanna secretly sneaks in and out of Caroline's bathroom.

Peter finds a positive pregnancy test in their bathroom on Christmas Day. Assuming it is his wife's, he stomps off, with the intention of leaving her. Caroline confronts everyone, and Joanna confesses the pregnancy test is hers. Then their mother reveals the long-buried secret that tore their family apart, so many years ago. James left them when she admitted she got pregnant by John, meaning that Vicky is John's biological daughter.

The family rushes into town for the kids' nativity play while James finds Peter. As the food Caroline had prepared is ruined, the Christmas family spends the day in the nursing home, serving their meals.

Cast
 Elizabeth Hurley as Joanna Christmas
 John Cleese as John Christmas
 Kelsey Grammer as James Christmas
 Nathalie Cox as Caroline Christmas-Hope
 Talulah Riley as Vicky Christmas
 Kris Marshall as Peter Hope
 Caroline Quentin as Elizabeth Christmas
 April Bowlby as Jackie
 Ray Fearon as Felix
 Naomi Frederick as Paulina Christmas
 Katy Brand as Reverend Jane
 Amelie Prescott as Daisey Christmas-Hope
 Oliver Smith as Henry Christmas-Hope

Production
Filming occurred at Birdsall House, near Malton in September 2020.  In November 2020, it was announced that filming had wrapped.

Sequel
A sequel titled Christmas in Paradise was released in November 2022.

See also
 List of Christmas films

References

External links
 
 

2021 comedy films
2020s Christmas comedy films
2020s English-language films
British Christmas comedy films
English-language Netflix original films
Films about dysfunctional families
Films shot in North Yorkshire
2020s British films